This list of the prehistoric life of Kansas contains the various prehistoric life-forms whose fossilized remains have been reported from within the US state of Kansas.

Precambrian
The Paleobiology Database records no known occurrences of Precambrian fossils in Kansas.

Paleozoic

Selected Paleozoic taxa of Kansas

  †Acanthodes
 †Achistrum
 †Acitheca
 †Acrodus – tentative report
 †Acroplous
 †Actiobates – type locality for genus
 †Actiobates peabodyi – type locality for species
 †Agassizodus
 †Agassizodus variabilis
 †Aglaocrinus
  †Alethopteris
 †Alethopteris grandini
 †Alethopteris serlii
 Ammodiscus – tentative report
 †Amphiscapha
 † Ananias – tentative report
  †Annularia
 †Annularia asteris
 †Annularia mucronata
 †Aphlebia
 Archaeolithophyllum
  †Archaeovenator – type locality for genus
 †Archaeovenator hamiltonensis – type locality for species
 †Archimylacris
 †Aristoceras
 †Artisia
 †Asterotheca
 †Asterotheca miltoni – or unidentified comparable form
 †Aviculopecten
 †Aviculopecten arctisulcatus
 †Aviculopecten mccoyi – type locality for species
 †Aviculopecten nodocosta
 †Aviculopecten occidentalis
 †Aviculopecten peculiaris – type locality for species
 †Aviculopecten sumnerensis – type locality for species
  †Belantsea – or unidentified comparable form
 †Bellerophon
 †Bellerophon graphicus – type locality for species
 †Blattoidea
 †Botryococcus
 †Botryococcus braunii
 †Calamites
 †Calamites cistii
 †Callipteris
 †Callipteris conferta
 †Callipteris lyratifolia – tentative report
 †Carbonita – tentative report
  †Caseodus
 †Caseodus eatoni
 †Chomatodus
 †Chonetes
 †Chonetes mesoloba
 †Cladodus
  Cladophlebis
 †Cleiothyridina
 †Cleiothyridina orbicularis
  †Composita
 †Composita elongata
 †Composita ovata
 †Composita subtilita
 †Cordaicarpus
 †Cordaites
 †Cordaites principalis
  †Ctenacanthus
 †Ctenacanthus amblyxiphias
 †Cyathus
 †Cyclopteris
 †Cystodictya
 †Dentalium
  †Diplichnites
 †Diplichnites gouldi
 †Ductilodon – type locality for genus
 †Dunbaria – type locality for genus
 †Echinaria
 †Edestus
 †Edestus heinrichi – or unidentified comparable form
 †Edmondia
  †Eocasea – type locality for genus
 †Eocasea martini – type locality for species
 †Eoscopus – type locality for genus
 †Eoscopus lockardi – type locality for species
 †Euconcordia – type locality for genus
 †Fenestella
 †Fusulina
 †Geinitzina
 †Gervillia
 †Glenopteris
  †Glikmanius
 †Glikmanius occidentalis
 †Glyptopleura
 †Gordia
 †Helminthopsis
 †Hybodus
  †Ianthasaurus – type locality for genus
 †Ianthasaurus hardestiorum – type locality for species
 †Ianthodon – type locality for genus
 †Ianthodon schultzei – type locality for species
 †Isogramma
 †Janassa
 †Kawichthys – type locality for genus
 †Kawichthys moodiei – type locality for species
 †Kennedya – type locality for genus
 †Kirkella
 †Kouphichnium
 †Lepidodendron
 †Lingula
 †Lisca – type locality for genus
 †Lissodus
  †Listracanthus
 Lithophaga
  †Lysorophus
 †Meganeuropsis – type locality for genus
 †Meganeuropsis permiana – type locality for species
 †Megatypus – type locality for genus
 †Metacoceras
 †Minilya
 †Misthodotes – type locality for genus
 †Modiolus
  †Naticopsis
 †Neoaganides
 †Neospirifer
 †Neospirifer cameratus
 †Neospirifer dunbari
 †Neospirifer kansasensis
  †Neuropteris
 †Neuropteris auriculata – tentative report
 †Neuropteris odontopteroides
 †Neuropteris ovata
 †Neuropteris scheuchzeri
 †Noeggerathia
 †Norwoodia
 Nucula
  †Ophiacodon – type locality for genus
 †Ophiacodon hilli – type locality for species
 †Orodus
 †Orthacanthus
 †Palaeoniscus
 †Paleolimulus – type locality for genus
 †Pecopteris
 †Pecopteris hemitelioides
 †Pecopteris unita
 †Petalodus
  †Petrolacosaurus – type locality for genus
 †Petrolacosaurus kansensis – type locality for species
 †Phillipsia – tentative report
  †Platyceras
 †Platysomus
 Pleurotomaria
 †Samaropsis
 †Sandalodus – or unidentified comparable form
 †Sigillaria
 †Sigillaria brardii
 †Sphenophyllum
 †Sphenophyllum oblongifolium
 †Sphenophyllum stoukenbergi – or unidentified comparable form
 †Sphenophyllum thonii – or unidentified comparable form
 †Sphenopteris
  †Spinoaequalis – type locality for genus
 †Spirifer
 †Spirifer rockymontanus – tentative report
 Spirorbis
 †Stemmatodus
 †Streptognathodus
 †Streptognathodus zethus
  †Syringopora
 †Tetrataxis
 †Therates – type locality for genus
 †Treptichnus
 †Undichna
 †Undichna britannica
 †Undichna simplicitas
 †Urba – type locality for genus
  †Walchia
 †Wilkingia
 †Worthenia
 †Xyrospondylus
 Yoldia

Mesozoic

Selected Mesozoic taxa of Kansas

  †Acanthoscaphites – tentative report
 †Acanthoscaphites reesidei
 †Alzadasaurus – type locality for genus
 †Ampullina
 †Anomia
 †Apateodus
 †Apatornis
 †Apatornis celer – type locality for species
 †Apsopelix
 †Apsopelix anglicus
 Aralia
 Arundo
 †Asplenium
 †Aviculopecten
 †Aviculopecten occidentalis
  †Baculites
 †Baculites clinolobatus
 †Baculites compressus
 †Baculites grandis
 †Baculites ovatus
 †Baculites pseudovatus – type locality for species
 †Bananogmius
 †Baptornis – type locality for genus
 †Baptornis advenus – type locality for species
 Botula
 †Botula carolinensis
  †Brachauchenius – type locality for genus
 †Brachauchenius lucasi – type locality for species
 Brachidontes
 Cadulus
 †Calycoceras
 Carcharias
 Cardita
 †Cassiope
 †Ceratophyllum
 Chiloscyllium
 †Chondrites
  †Cimolichthys
 †Cimolichthys nepaholica
 Cladophlebis
 †Claosaurus
 †Claosaurus agilis – type locality for species
  †Clidastes
 †Clidastes liodontus
 †Clidastes velox
 Cliona
 †Collignoniceras
 †Collignoniceras woollgari
 †Coniasaurus
 Corbula
 Crassostrea
 †Cretolamna
 †Cretolamna appendiculata
  †Cretoxyrhina
 †Cretoxyrhina mantelli
 Ctenochelys
 Cucullaea
 †Cycadeoidea
 †Dakotasuchus – type locality for genus
 †Dakotasuchus kingi – type locality for species
 †Dawndraco – type locality for genus
 †Dawndraco kanzai – type locality for species
  †Desmatochelys
 †Discoscaphites
  †Dolichorhynchops – type locality for genus
 †Dolichorhynchops osborni – type locality for species
 †Durania
 †Ectenosaurus
 †Ectenosaurus clidastoides
  †Elasmosaurus – type locality for genus
 †Elasmosaurus nobilis – type locality for species
 †Elasmosaurus platyurus – type locality for species
 †Elasmosaurus sternbergi – type locality for species
  †Enchodus
 †Enchodus gladiolus
 †Enchodus petrosus
 †Euspira
 †Fagus
 †Gegania
 †Gervillia
 †Gervillia mudgeana
 †Gervillia mudgenana
  †Gillicus
 †Gillicus arcuatus
 Gleichenia
  †Globidens
 †Gryphaea
 †Gryphaea corrugata
 †Gryphaea hilli
 †Gryphaea mucronata
 †Gryphaea navia
 †Halisaurus
 †Halisaurus sternbergi – type locality for species
  †Hesperornis – type locality for genus
 †Hesperornis crassipes – type locality for species
 †Hesperornis gracilis – type locality for species
 †Hesperornis regalis – type locality for species
 †Heteroceras
 †Hierosaurus – type locality for genus
 †Hoploscaphites
 †Hoploscaphites nicolletii
 †Iaceornis
 †Iaceornis marshi – type locality for species
  †Ichthyornis – type locality for genus
 †Ichthyornis dispar – type locality for species
  †Inoceramus
 †Inoceramus cuvieri
 †Inoceramus ginterensis
 †Inoceramus tenuistriatus – tentative report
 †Ischyrhiza
 †Ischyrhiza mira
 †Jeletzkytes
 †Jeletzkytes nodosus
 †Leiosphaeridia
 †Leptostyrax
 †Linearis
 †Lingula
 Linuparus
 Lopha
 †Magnoavipes
 Marsilea
 †Mathilda
  †Megacephalosaurus – type locality for genus
 †Megacephalosaurus eulerti – type locality for species
 Membranipora
 †Modiolus
 †Niobrarasaurus
 †Niobrarasaurus coleii – type locality for species
 †Niobrarateuthis
 †Niobrarateuthis bonneri – type locality for species
 †Niobrarateuthis walkeri – type locality for species
 Nucula
  †Nyctosaurus
 †Nyctosaurus bonneri – type locality for species
 †Nyctosaurus gracilis – type locality for species
 †Nyctosaurus nanus – type locality for species
 †Ogmodirus – type locality for genus
 Ostrea
  †Pachyrhizodus
 †Pachyrhizodus caninus – or unidentified comparable form
 †Pachyrhizodus minimus
 †Parahesperornis – type locality for genus
 †Parahesperornis alexi – type locality for species
 †Pecten
 Pholadomya
 Pinus
 †Placenticeras
 †Placenticeras meeki
 Platanus
  †Platecarpus
 †Platecarpus planifrons – type locality for species
 †Platecarpus tympaniticus
 †Platyceramus
 †Platyceramus platinus
 †Platypterygius – or unidentified comparable form
 †Plesiochelys
 †Plesiosaurus
 Plicatula
  †Polycotylus – type locality for genus
 †Polycotylus latipinnis – type locality for species
 †Prisca – tentative report
 †Protocardia
 †Protosphyraena
 †Protosphyraena tenuis
  †Protostega
 †Pseudoperna
 †Pseudoperna congesta
  †Pteranodon – type locality for genus
 †Pteranodon comptus – type locality for species
 †Pteranodon longiceps – type locality for species
 †Pteranodon sternbergi – type locality for species
 †Pteria
 †Pterotrigonia
 †Ptychodus
 †Ptychodus anonymus – or unidentified comparable form
 †Ptychodus decurrens
 †Ptychodus mortoni
 †Ptychodus occidentalis
 †Ptychodus whipplei
 †Ptychotrygon
 †Ptychotrygon triangularis
 Quercus
 †Repichnia
 Rhinobatos
 †Rhinobatos incertus
 †Rhizocorallium
 Sassafras
  †Scapanorhynchus
 †Scapanorhynchus rhaphiodon
 †Scaphites
 †Scolicia
 Scyliorhinus
 †Selmasaurus
 †Selmasaurus johnsoni – type locality for species
 †Sequoia
 Serpula
  †Silvisaurus – type locality for genus
 †Silvisaurus condrayi – type locality for species
  Squalicorax
 †Squalicorax curvatus
 †Squalicorax falcatus
 †Squalicorax kaupi
 †Squalicorax pristodontus – or unidentified comparable form
 †Squalicorax volgensis
 Sterculia
  †Styxosaurus – type locality for genus
 †Styxosaurus snowii – type locality for species
 Tellina
 †Terminonaris
 †Toxochelys
 †Toxochelys latiremis
 Trachycardium
 †Tragodesmoceras
 †Trinacromerum – type locality for genus
 †Trinacromerum bentonianum – type locality for species
 Turritella
  †Tylosaurus
 †Tylosaurus dyspelor
 †Tylosaurus kansasensis – type locality for species
 †Tylosaurus proriger
 †Uintacrinus
 †Uintacrinus socialis
 †Urenchelys
  †Xiphactinus
 †Xiphactinus audax
 Yoldia

Cenozoic

Selected Cenozoic taxa of Kansas

 Acris
 †Acris crepitans
 †Adelphailurus
  †Aelurodon
 Agkistrodon
 †Agriocharis
 †Agriotherium
 †Alforjas
 †Allogona
 †Allogona profunda
 †Ambystoma
 †Ambystoma maculatum
 †Ambystoma tigrinum
  †Amebelodon
 Amia
 †Amia calva
 †Amphimachairodus
 Anas
 †Anas crecca
 †Aphelops
 Aplodinotus
 †Aplodinotus grunniens – or unidentified comparable form
 †Arctodus
 †Arctodus pristinus – or unidentified comparable form
 †Arctodus simus
 †Astrohippus
 Baiomys
  †Barbourofelis
 Bassariscus
 Bison
 †Bison antiquus – type locality for species
 †Bison bison
  †Bison latifrons
 Blarina
 †Blarina brevicauda
 †Blarina carolinensis
  †Borophagus
 †Borophagus diversidens
 †Borophagus hilli
 †Borophagus pugnator
 †Borophagus secundus – type locality for species
 Botaurus
 Bufo
 †Bufo cognatus
 †Bufo hemiophrys
 †Bufo marinus
 †Bufo woodhousei
 †Calippus
  †Camelops
 Candona
 Canis
 †Canis armbrusteri
  †Canis dirus
 †Canis edwardii
 †Canis ferox
 †Canis latrans
 †Canis lepophagus
 †Capromeryx
 †Carpocyon
 Carychium
 †Carychium exiguum
 Castor
 †Castor canadensis
 †Castoroides
 †Castoroides ohioensis – or unidentified comparable form
 †Catostomus
 †Catostomus commersoni
 Celtis
  †Ceratogaulus
 †Ceratogaulus hatcheri
 †Ceratogaulus minor
 †Cervalces
  †Cervalces scotti
 Cervus
 †Cervus elaphus
 Chaetodipus
 †Chaetodipus hispidus
 Chara
 †Chasmaporthetes
 Chelydra
  †Chelydra serpentina
 Chrysemys
 †Chrysemys picta
 †Cionella
 †Cionella lubrica
 Clethrionomys
 †Clethrionomys gapperi
 Cnemidophorus
 †Cnemidophorus sexlineatus
 Coluber
 †Coluber constrictor
  †Cosoryx
 †Cosoryx furcatus
 Crotalus
 †Crotalus viridis
 †Cryptantha
 Cryptotis
 †Cryptotis parva
 Cynomys
 †Cynomys gunnisoni – or unidentified comparable form
  †Cynomys ludovicianus
 Deroceras
 Diadophis
 †Diadophis punctatus
  †Dinohippus
 Dipodomys
 †Dipodomys ordii – or unidentified comparable form
 †Dipoides
 Discus
 Egretta
 Elaphe – type locality for genus
 †Elaphe obsoleta
 †Elaphe vulpina
 Emydoidea
  †Epicyon
 †Epicyon haydeni
 Equus
 †Equus conversidens
 †Equus francisci
 †Equus giganteus – or unidentified comparable form
 †Equus niobrarensis
 †Equus scotti
  †Equus simplicidens
 †Eucastor
 †Euconulus
 †Euconulus fulvus
  †Eucyon
 †Eucyon davisi
 Eumeces
 †Eumeces fasciatus
 †Eumeces obsoletus
 †Eumeces septentrionalis
 Felis
 Ferrissia
  †Fundulus
 Gastrocopta
 †Gastrocopta armifera
 Geochelone
 Geomys
 †Geomys bursarius
 Gerrhonotus
 †Gigantocamelus
 †Gnathabelodon
  †Gomphotherium
 Gopherus
 Graptemys
 †Graptemys geographica
 Grus
 †Grus americana
 Gyraulus
 †Gyraulus parvus
 Hawaiia
 †Hawaiia minuscula
 Helicodiscus
 †Helicodiscus parallelus
 Helisoma
 †Helisoma anceps
 †Helisoma trivolvis
  †Hemiauchenia
 †Hemiauchenia macrocephala
 †Hesperotestudo
 Heterodon
 †Heterodon nasicus
 †Heterodon platyrhinos
 †Hipparion
  †Hippotherium
 Holbrookia
 †Holbrookia maculata
  †Holmesina
 Homo
 †Homo sapiens
 †Homotherium
 †Homotherium serum
 Hyla
 †Hyla cinerea – or unidentified comparable form
 †Hyla gratiosa – or unidentified comparable form
 †Hyla squirella – or unidentified comparable form
 †Hyla versicolor
  †Hypohippus
 †Hypolagus
 Ictalurus
 †Ictalurus melas
 †Ictalurus punctatus
 †Ictiobus
 †Ischyrocyon – tentative report
 Kinosternon
 †Kinosternon flavescens
 †Kinosternon subrubrum
  Lampropeltis
 †Lampropeltis calligaster
 †Lampropeltis getulus
 Lasiurus
 †Lasiurus cinereus
 Lepisosteus
 †Lepisosteus osseus
 †Lepisosteus platostomus – tentative report
 Lepomis
 †Lepomis cyanellus
 †Lepomis humilis – or unidentified comparable form
  †Leptocyon
 Lepus
 †Lepus californicus – or unidentified comparable form
 †Longirostromeryx
 Lontra
 †Lontra canadensis
 Lymnaea
 Lynx
 †Machairodus
 Macrochelys
 †Macrochelys temminckii
 †Mammut
 †Mammut americanum
 †Mammuthus
  †Mammuthus columbi
 Martes
 †Megalonyx
 †Megalonyx jeffersonii
  †Megalonyx leptostomus
 †Megantereon
  †Megatylopus
 †Menetus
 Mephitis
 †Mephitis mephitis – tentative report
 †Merychyus
 Micropterus
 †Micropterus punctulatus – or unidentified comparable form
 Microtus
 †Microtus ochrogaster
  †Microtus pennsylvanicus
 †Minytrema – tentative report
 Musculium
 †Musculium transversum
 Mustela
 †Mustela richardsonii – or unidentified comparable form
 †Mylagaulus
  †Mylohyus
 †Mylohyus fossilis
 Myotis
  †Nannippus
 †Nassella
 Neofiber
Neogale
†Neogale frenata – or unidentified comparable form
 †Neogale vison
 †Neohipparion
 Neotoma
 †Neotoma floridana – or unidentified comparable form
 †Neotoma micropus
 Nerodia
 †Nerodia sipedon
 Nesovitrea
  †Nimravides
  †Nothrotheriops
 Notiosorex
 †Notiosorex crawfordi
 †Notropis – tentative report
 Odocoileus
 Ondatra
 †Ondatra zibethicus
 Onychomys
 †Onychomys leucogaster – or unidentified comparable form
 Ophisaurus
 †Ophisaurus attenuatus
 Ortalis
 Oryzomys
 †Oryzomys palustris
 †Panicum
 †Panicum elegans
 Panthera
  †Panthera leo
  †Paramylodon
 †Paramylodon harlani
 †Pediomeryx
 †Peraceras
 Perca
 †Perca flavescens
 Perognathus
 Peromyscus
 Phenacomys
 †Phenacomys intermedius – or unidentified comparable form
 Phrynosoma
 †Phrynosoma cornutum
 Physa
 Pisidium
 Pituophis
 †Pituophis catenifer
 †Pituophis melanoleucus
  †Platybelodon
  †Platygonus
 †Platygonus compressus – or unidentified comparable form
 Plegadis – or unidentified comparable form
 †Pleiolama
 †Plesiogulo
 †Pliohippus
 †Pomoxis
 †Potamocypris
 †Pratifelis
 †Pratifelis martini – type locality for species
 †Procamelus
 †Procastoroides
 Procyon
 †Procyon lotor
  †Protohippus
 †Protolabis
 Pseudacris
 †Pseudacris triseriata
 Pseudemys
  †Pseudhipparion
 Puma
 †Puma concolor
 Pupilla
 Pupoides
  †Ramoceros
 †Rana
 †Rana areolata – or unidentified comparable form
 †Rana catesbeiana
 †Rana pipiens
 †Rana areolata – or unidentified comparable form
 †Rana catesbeiana
 †Rana pipiens
 †Regina
 Reithrodontomys
 †Reithrodontomys humulis
 †Reithrodontomys megalotis
 †Reithrodontomys montanus – or unidentified comparable form
 Rhinocheilus – tentative report
  †Rhinocheilus lecontei
  †Rhynchotherium
 †Satherium
 †Satherium piscinarium
 Scalopus
 †Scalopus aquaticus
 Scaphiopus
 Sceloporus
 †Sceloporus undulatus
 †Semotilus
 †Semotilus atromaculatus – or unidentified comparable form
 Sigmodon
 Sistrurus
 †Sistrurus catenatus
  †Smilodon
 †Soergelia
  †Soergelia mayfieldi – or unidentified comparable form
 Sorex
 †Sorex arcticus
 †Sorex cinereus
 †Sorex palustris
 Spea
 †Spea bombifrons
 Spermophilus
 †Spermophilus franklinii – or unidentified comparable form
 †Spermophilus richardsonii
 †Spermophilus tridecemlineatus
 Sphaerium
 Spilogale
 †Spilogale putorius
 Stagnicola
  †Stegomastodon
 †Stegomastodon mirificus
 †Stenotrema
 Sternotherus
 †Sternotherus odoratus
 Storeria
 †Storeria dekayi – or unidentified comparable form
 Succinea
  †Succinea ovalis
 Sylvilagus
 †Sylvilagus floridanus
 Synaptomys
  Tapirus
 †Tapirus veroensis
 Taxidea
 †Taxidea taxus
  †Teleoceras
 Terrapene
 †Terrapene carolina
 Thamnophis
 †Thamnophis proximus
  †Thamnophis radix
 †Thamnophis sauritus – or unidentified comparable form
 †Thamnophis sirtalis
 Thomomys
 †Thomomys talpoides
 Trachemys
  †Trachemys scripta
 †Trigonictis
 †Trigonictis macrodon
 Trionyx
 Tropidoclonion
 †Tropidoclonion lineatum
 Tympanuchus – or unidentified comparable form
 Urocyon
  †Urocyon cinereoargenteus
 †Urocyon progressus
 †Ustatochoerus
 Vallonia
 †Vallonia gracilicosta
 †Vallonia pulchella
 Valvata
 †Valvata tricarinata
 Vertigo
 †Vertigo ovata
 Vulpes
  †Vulpes velox
 Zapus
  †Zapus hudsonius
 Zonitoides
 †Zonitoides arboreus
 †Zonitoides nitidus

References
 

Kansas